Rosalie Moore, Gertrude Elizabeth Moore  (October 8, 1910 in Oakland, California – June 18, 2001 in Petaluma, California) was an American poet.

Life
She graduated from the University of California, Berkeley magna cum laude with a B.A. in 1932; with an MA in 1934. From 1935 to 1937 she worked for radio station KLX, and then the Census Bureau. In 1937, she attended the poetry-writing classes of Lawrence Hart.

She joined the group of poets known as the Activists.

She married William L. Brown in 1942; they have three daughters and three grandchildren living in Marin County.

From 1965 to 1976, she taught at the College of Marin. Kay Ryan was her student. Her work has been published in Accent, Furioso, The New Yorker, and Saturday Review. Her papers are held at University of Oregon library.

Awards
 1938 University of Chicago's Charles H. Sergel award for poetic drama with her play The Boar
 1943 Albert Bender Award in literature
 1949 Yale Series Younger Poet Award for The Grasshopper's Man (originally titled "Journeys Toward Center")
 1950, 1951 Guggenheim Fellowships

Works
 The Grasshopper's Man and Other Poems, Yale University Press, 1949
 Year of the Children, 1977 a book of poems dealing with the Children's Crusade in Europe in 1212 A.D.

Anthologies

Children's books
 The Forest Fireman, Coward-McCann, 1954
 Whistle Punk
 The Boy Who Got Mailed, Coward-McCann, 1957
 Big Rig, Coward-McCann, 1959
 The Department Store Ghost
 Tickley and the Fox, Lantern Press, 1962
 The Hippopotamus That Wanted to Be a Baby  Lantern Press.

Play
 The Calydonian Boar Hunt.

References

External links
 Guide to the Rosalie Moore Papers at the University of Oregon

1910 births
2001 deaths
Writers from Oakland, California
University of California, Berkeley alumni
American women poets
Yale Younger Poets winners
20th-century American poets
20th-century American women writers